The Southern California Baseball Association or SCBA was a baseball-only conference that existed from 1977 to 1984. It was made up of schools from the Big West Conference, then known as the Pacific Coast Athletic Association (PCAA), and West Coast Conference, then known as the West Coast Athletic Conference (WCAC). In 1977, the PCAA and WCAC realigned themselves for baseball only into a north conference (NCBA) and south conference (SCBA). In the league's inaugural season there were seven teams. The next year, UC Irvine joined, and from then until the demise of the conference the membership stood at eight schools. San Diego State left after the 1978 season but was immediately replaced by San Diego, and Cal State Los Angeles left after the next-to-last season of 1983 and was replaced for the league's final season by UNLV, the only non-California member in SCBA history. The SCBA was dominated by Cal State Fullerton who won the league title all eight seasons, while competing in four College World Series and claiming their first two national titles.

Member schools

Sports leagues established in 1977
1977 establishments in California
Organizations disestablished in 1984
1984 disestablishments in California
Baseball leagues in California
Defunct baseball leagues in the United States
Defunct college sports conferences in the United States
College baseball by conference in the United States
Big West Conference baseball
West Coast Conference baseball